Unión Deportiva Valdez was an Ecuadorian football club based in Milagro, Guayas. Founded in 1915, it played one season in the top-flight Serie A in 1978. It dissolved in 1997.

Achievements
Serie B
Runner-up (1): 1978 E1
Campeonato Professional de Guayaquil
Champion (2): 1953, 1954

References

Defunct football clubs in Ecuador
Association football clubs disestablished in 1979
1979 disestablishments in Ecuador